Danny Galm (born 17 March 1986) is a German former professional footballer who played as a striker. He is the current head coach of Bayern Munich U19. Having previously played for VfB Stuttgart II, Eintracht Frankfurt II, and Energie Cottbus, he joined  Stuttgarter Kickers in February 2009, but transferred to 1. FC Kaiserslautern II after Stuttgarter Kickers were relegated from the 3. Liga. He spent four-and-a-half seasons with SpVgg Neckarelz. After a half-season with Viktoria Aschaffenburg, he ended his playing career.

References

1986 births
Living people
Association football forwards
German footballers
VfB Stuttgart II players
Eintracht Frankfurt II players
FC Energie Cottbus II players
Stuttgarter Kickers players
1. FC Kaiserslautern II players
SpVgg Neckarelz players
Viktoria Aschaffenburg players
3. Liga players
Regionalliga players
People from Miltenberg
Sportspeople from Lower Franconia
Footballers from Bavaria